The King of Holland's bird of paradise, also known as King William III's bird of paradise or the exquisite little king, is a bird in the family Paradisaeidae that is a hybrid between a magnificent bird of paradise and king bird of paradise.

History
At least 26 adult male specimens of this hybrid exist in various collections, including the American Museum of Natural History and the Manchester Museum, coming mainly from north coastal New Guinea or unknown localities.  It was described as a new species by Adolf Bernard Meyer in 1875 and diagnosed as a hybrid by Jacques Berlioz in 1927.

Notes

References
 
 

Hybrid birds of paradise
Birds of New Guinea